The Battle of Knjaževac was a battle of the Second Balkan War, fought between the Bulgarian and the Serbian army. The battle took in July 1913 and ended with the capture of the Serbian city by the Bulgarian 1st Army.

References

Sources 
 

Battles of the Second Balkan War
Battles involving Bulgaria
Battles involving Serbia
Conflicts in 1913
1913 in Bulgaria
1913 in Serbia
July 1913 events